Bachdenkel were an English rock group which came to life in and around the King's Heath area of Birmingham in the late 1960s, evolving out of a combo called "U No Who" whose members were Colin Swinburne (1948-2021), Peter Kimberley, Terry Hyland, Dave Bradley and Ron Lee.

Bachdenkel was one of the seminal bands on the Birmingham scene during the late 1960s, which saw the development of psychedelic culture and electric rock music. 

In 1968 Brian Smith replaced Ron Lee on drums and when Dave Bradley exited the group they became a three piece with Peter Kimberley on a six string Fender bass. They had close links with the Birmingham Arts Lab, a venue for experimental artists of all types, and often performed with a full psychedelic light show.

Following a publicity campaign which included subverting a large department store's marketing logo and a photo-shoot with a piano in a local fountain, they left the country. They subsequently found themselves in Paris, long the refuge of revolutionary artists and artistic revolutionaries. After the events of May 1968, France was ready for new ideas and new music and English rock bands were much in vogue at the time.

Bachdenkel settled in France and over the next decade went on to produce two albums: Lemmings in 1973 and Stalingrad in 1977. At times in their career, they shared the billing with Led Zeppelin and Black Sabbath amongst others and provided the music for a modern ballet.

Band line-up
 Colin Swinburne - lead guitar, vocals
 Peter Kimberley - bass guitar, vocals
 Terry Hyland - vocals (U No Who)
 Dave Bradley - bass
 Ron Lee - drums
 Brian Smith - drums, vocals
 Karel Beer - twelve-string guitar

Discography
Lemmings (1973)
Stalingrad (1977)
Rise and Fall (2022 3-CD anthology on Grapefruit/Cherry Red Records)

Musical groups from Birmingham, West Midlands
English psychedelic rock music groups
English progressive rock groups
Musical groups established in 1968
Musical groups disestablished in 1982